Elections to the Volksraad were held in the Dutch East Indies in 1924.

Electoral system
The Volksraad had a total of 48 members, half of which were elected and half appointed. Seats were also assigned to ethnic groups, with 25 for the Dutch population (twelve elected, thirteen appointed), 20 for the native population (twelve elected, eight appointed) and three for the Chinese population (all of which were appointed).

Results

References

1924 elections in Asia
1924
1924 in the Dutch East Indies